Hildegard Breiner is from Vorarlberg, Austria, where she and her late husband led the anti-nuclear campaign against Zwentendorf Nuclear Power Plant in the 1970s. In 1978, an unprecedented 85 percent of the voters in Vorarlberg cast their votes against Zwentendorf, tipping the scales of the nationwide referendum. In the second half of the 1980s, Hildegard Breiner played a major role in opposition to the nuclear reprocessing plant Wackersdorf to be built at Wackersdorf in neighbouring Bavaria, Germany. In 2004, Hildegard Breiner received the  Nuclear-Free Future Lifetime Achievement Award.

See also
Anti-nuclear movement in Austria
Anti-nuclear movement in Germany
Freda Meissner-Blau

References 

Living people
Austrian anti–nuclear power activists
Year of birth missing (living people)